Wellesley Gol Talab, (also known as Gol Talab), is a park located in Taltala neighbourhood in Central Kolkata, in the Indian state of West Bengal.

The pond is known to exist since at least early 19th century due to the fact that famous Urdu poet, Ghalib wanted to settle in the locality.

Etymology
The name derives from the pond that is situated in the middle of the park, as "Gol" means "round", and "Talab" means pond in Hindi. The shape of the pond is square.

Location
The park is surrounded on all sides by Rafi Ahmed Kidwai Road, Alimuddin Street,  and Deedar Buksh Lane. The fourth side has a road that falls under addresses of Deedar Buksh Lane, Alimuddin Street, Waliullah Lane,  and Taltalla Lane.

See also
Taltala

References

Parks in Kolkata